Sidewalk Prophets is an American contemporary Christian music band from Nashville. Their album These Simple Truths contained the single "The Words I Would Say" which is also featured on WOW Hits 2010 and WOW Hits 2011. The group won the 2010 GMA Dove Award for New Artist of the Year.

Background
The band was formed by lead singer Dave Frey and rhythm guitarist Ben McDonald when the two were attending Anderson University in Indiana. A demo they recorded was taken without their knowledge to a campus recording contest, which earned them a performance slot. That in turn, led to radio program directors and record labels, and a chance encounter with Audio Adrenaline's Will McGinnis gave Dave the chance to sing in front of 20,000. The group landed a deal with Word Records after meeting with a record label executive and a showcasing themselves at Lancaster Christian Academy in Smyrna, Tennessee. It also features lead guitarist Shaun Tomczak, bassist Cal Joslin, and drummer Justin Nace. Tomczak left the band in January 2014 to spend time with his family, and Daniel Macal joined the band to take his place. Other past members of the group are guitarist Chris Jordan and bassist Chris Koboldt.

They have toured with Jeremy Camp and Audio Adrenaline on the strength of independent albums, then rode the popularity of their first Word Records release, These Simple Truths, to a Dove Award for New Artist of the Year and a nomination for Pop/Contemporary Album of the Year. "The Words I Would Say" reached No. 3, "You Can Have Me" entered the Top 20, a Christmas single, "Hope Was Born This Night", reached the Top 10, and "You Love Me Anyway" reached No. 1 on the Billboard Christian Singles chart. The band has also toured in the Rock and Worship Roadshow with MercyMe and Francesca Battistelli among others, and received another Dove nomination for Group of the Year in 2011.

Their next album, Live Like That was produced by Ian Eskelin who also produced "The Words I Would Say". The record is a tribute to the band's fans, some of whom were selected through a contest to sing background vocals. The band also solicited photos of people their fans admire and want to be like for use on the cover.

In December 2017, they announced a 40-city tour the Something Different Tour (in 3D) for early 2018 with special guests Bonray.

Discography

Albums

Singles

Promotional singles

Other charted songs

Awards and nominations
GMA Dove Awards

Tours

The Sidewalk Prophets have toured the United States and other countries with many famous acts including Jeremy Camp, Stellar Kart, and Audio Adrenaline before being signed to Word Records and appeared on the 2010 and 2011 Winter Jam Tour Spectacular sharing the stage alongside Tenth Avenue North, Newsboys, and Third Day.

They also toured on the Rock and Worship Roadshow 2010 with MercyMe, Francesca Battistelli, David Crowder Band, Remedy Drive, Fee, and Family Force 5. In 2013, they toured along with TobyMac and Red in the Winter Jam Tour Spectacular.

The 2013 tour included many dates with Matthew West. The tour concluded on November 18, 2013. Also, on the tour was American Idol alum Jason Castro.

References

External links

 

American Christian rock groups
Fervent Records artists
Musical groups from Indiana
Musical groups established in 2003
Performers of contemporary Christian music
Word Records artists